Delta Phi Kappa (previously The Friars Club and Delta Phi), was a fraternity for male returned missionaries of the Church of Jesus Christ of Latter-day Saints (LDS Church) at colleges in Utah, Idaho, and Arizona. It existed from 1920 to 1978.

History

Founding and early growth
Delta Phi Kappa was founded in 1869 at the University of Deseret (now University of Utah) as a debating society called Delta Phi; it disappeared in 1904. Stephen G. Covey and Elmer Jenkins, two LDS Church returned missionaries organized a club for returned missionaries. The goal of the club was to help each other keep "the high and worthy ideals of manhood which became a servant of the Master." Covey and Jenkins described the club idea to president of the University of Utah, John A. Widtsoe. Widstoe approved the club and counseled Covey and Jenkins about how to create the club.  The club had to open their membership to former missionaries of all faiths in order to obtain approval from the Board of Regents. Specifically, the club was open to those who had served at least a six-month mission for any Christian denomination, or was attending a school of divinity and had done enough religious service to be equivalent to a six-month mission. The club was established as the "Friars Club" for returned missionaries of the LDS Church on November 24, 1920. The three official founding members of the club were Covey, Scott Partridge, and Donald Daynes. Because of Widtsoe's contributions to the establishment of the Friar's Club, he was known as the club's foster father. Covey was elected as the club's first president. The club's symbol was Friar Tuck and the club's colors were orange and black. Elva Chipman and Sadye Eccles were the only women to join the fraternity, as the membership was restricted to men after its first year due to the lack of returned female missionaries.

In 1922, in response to the Friars Club, some students and faculty members created the "Fryers Club", a group of "avowed atheists" in an attempt to prevent influence of the Friars Club on campus. The Board of Regents required the "Fryers Club" submit meeting notes to be inspected due to complaints from Friars Club members. The Fryers Club did not comply with the requests of the Board and was dissolved. The average membership of the Friars Club during the 1920s was over 50 members. In 1927, chapters of the Friars Club were added at Weber State College (WSC) (W chapter) and the Utah Agricultural College (A chapter), with Lewellyn McKay named as the first Interchapter president. Widtsoe, David O. McKay, Thomas E. McKay, Adam S. Bennion, and Richard R. Lyman were among patrons given honorary membership of the Friars Club. The Friars Club tried to convince members of the Young Doctors of Divinity Club (YDD) at Brigham Young University (BYU) to join the Friars Club. After much convincing and correspondence, the clubs were merged on the condition that the women in the YDD be permitted to exist as an auxiliary group of the Friars Club, called the YDDers. The Y chapter of the Friars Club was established at BYU in 1929. In 1930, two alumni chapters were added in Los Angeles and Salt Lake City.

Merger
Bennion and the Friars Club president discussed concerns about the purpose of the club and its name. A non-religious group in New York had the same name and this would have caused confusion if the Friars Club expanded eastward. Others stated that the group was insulting to Catholics or disliked the name or the fraternity-like activities the Friars were participating in such as blackballing nominees. Alton Melville, president of the Friars, confessed to another Friar that he secretly intended the club be a social fraternity rather than a religious club. Chapter officers lobbied for a name change and merged with Delta Phi, the old debating society. The merge was approved by many alumni of Delta Phi. The Friar's Club was merged with the previous Delta Phi Society in 1931, adopting the namesake of Delta Phi and its history as the oldest fraternity in Utah. Previous members of the Delta Phi debating society were considered honorary members of the new fraternity. After the merger, the fraternity began selecting alumni as presidents rather than students. The fraternity gained members and popularity during the 1930s, but World War II sent many of its members away. Consequently, membership in all of the chapters diminished except University of Utah's chapter, whose medical and engineering students were exempted from the United States draft. After the war, membership in the chapters increased significantly. Yesharah Society, a sorority at BYU for sister missionaries, was similar in purpose to Delta Phi.

After the merger
Delta Phi was led by volunteer nation officers which brought the fraternity to other campuses and established housing for some members. The fraternity established and ran housing at Utah State University (USU), Ricks College, and University of Utah. The name was changed to Delta Phi Kappa in 1961, due to naming conflicts with an eastern fraternity also called Delta Phi. Delta Phi Kappa was not sponsored or funded by the LDS Church, but was encouraged by the LDS Church. The purpose of the fraternity was to allow returned missionaries to socially interact with other men with "high standards" and to allow them to gradually adjust to normal dating and social lives after two years of an LDS missionary lifestyle. Over ten thousand men belonged to the fraternity at the University of Utah, BYU, USU, WSC, Idaho State University, Ricks College, Branch Agricultural College at Cedar City (Southern Utah State College), and Arizona State University between 1920 and 1978. Chapters provided special sacrament meetings to wards near their campuses as well as presented spiritual programs and talent shows for local prison and mental hospitals. Other service activities included attending the temple, and helping train future missionaries of the LDS Church.

Merger and dissociation
In 1978, Delta Phi Kappa was absorbed by the LDS Church into Sigma Gamma Chi, which was open to all college aged men and not restricted to only returned missionaries. Sigma Gamma Chi was disbanded in 2011 along with Lambda Delta Sigma, the equivalent for women, which ended LDS Church-sponsored fraternities, sororities, and other social clubs.

Chapters
Chapters as of 1968:
1920 University of Utah
1927 Utah State University
1927 Weber State University
1929 Brigham Young University
1949 Ricks College
1951 Arizona State University
1965 Southern Utah University
1966 Idaho State University

National Presidents
Howard G. Kelly, 1931–1932 
Milton Bennion, 1932–1934 
Levi E. Young, 1934–1937 
John A. Widtsoe, 1937–1952 
Avard Booth (acting president), 1952–1953 
Matthew Cowley, 1953 
Harold H. Smith, 1954 (acting president) 
Milton R. Hunter, 1954–1960 
Henry D. Taylor, 1960–1965 
Paul H. Dunn, 1965–1968 
Marion D. Hanks, 1968–1976 
Harold Smith, 1976–1978

Notable members
Ronald A. Rasband
Mahonri Young
Joseph F. Merrill
Stephen L Richards
J. Reuben Clark
Harden Bennion

See also
Sigma Gamma Chi

References

Latter Day Saint fraternities and sororities in the United States
University of Utah
Defunct organizational subdivisions of the Church of Jesus Christ of Latter-day Saints
Defunct fraternities and sororities
Harold B. Lee Library-related University Archives articles
Men's organizations in the United States
Men's religious organizations